Ifedayo Olarinde (born 6 May 1976), popularly known as Daddy Freeze, is a Nigerian-Romanian broadcaster and radio talk show host.

Early life 
Ifedayo Olarinde was born in Cluj-Napoca, Romania to a Nigerian father and a Romanian mother. He spent most of his early years in Ibadan, Oyo State where he attended the International School, and has a degree in Sociology from the University of Ibadan. He is from Oyan Town in Odo Otin local government area of Osun State.

Career 
Freeze commenced his radio career in 1996 with the Broadcasting Corporation of Oyo State (BCOS), Ibadan where he served as a correspondent on The World Chart Show, and joined Cool FM in 2001 working in radio presenting, television and general entertainment. He was a senior broadcaster at Cool FM Lagos.

He is also an event compere. He has hosted a number of music concerts, comedy shows and Nollywood premieres in Nigeria, Ghana and the United Kingdom.  He is the leader of #FreeTheSheeple Movement

In 2017,  Daddy Freeze started  the Free Nation Online Church where he pastors with Sunday and weekday services.

In 2020, Freeze announced his departure from Cool FM where he had  worked for over 20 years.

Accolades

Freeze has been nominated for various awards and has won several others like:

2011 Nigerian Broadcasters Merit Awards – Most Popular Radio Presenter  
2012 Mode Men Awards – Radio Personality of the Year    
2013 Nigeria Entertainment Awards – Best Radio/TV Personality  
2014 Nickelodeon Kids' Choice Awards – Favourite Nigerian On-Air Personality

References

1976 births
Nigerian Christians
Nigerian radio presenters
Nigerian television presenters
Romanian radio presenters
Romanian television presenters
Living people
Yoruba radio personalities
Nigerian media personalities
University of Ibadan alumni
International School, Ibadan alumni
Romanian people of Nigerian descent
People from Cluj-Napoca